"Dance Macabre" is a song by Swedish rock band Ghost. It was their second single off of their fourth studio album Prequelle. It topped the Billboard Mainstream Rock Songs chart for two weeks in February 2019.

Background
"Dance Macabre" is a song from Ghost's fourth studio album, Prequelle. The song was debuted in a live setting, being played live at a surprise live show on May 5, 2018. The studio version was previewed via the band's Instagram story on May 17, a day prior to being officially released. Additionally, a separate version of the song, a disco remix version, was released on August 24, 2018, done by synthwave musician Carpenter Brut. The remix had been requested by Ghost frontman Tobias Forge in April 2018, after Brut had opened for Ghost on tour in 2016.
 
The song was later released as the second single from Prequelle, after "Rats". A music video was released on October 17, 2018. It was described by Consequence of Sound as "a homage to The Rocky Horror Picture Show." In February 2019, the song topped the Billboard Mainstream Rock Songs chart for two weeks. It was the band's third consecutive song to top the chart, after "Rats" and "Square Hammer".

Composition and themes
Musically, the song was noted as having more of a "dance music" vibe than most of their work. Forge noted that when he originally wrote the song, he didn't envision it as a Ghost song, but once he started writing lyrics, he felt he could make it work as part of the album. Forge also shared the track with some "songwriter friends" of his, who encouraged him to use it as a Ghost song. Forge was inspired by the music diversity that Queen would have with their albums, feeling that Ghost could similarly use some diversity. Lyrically, the song is about the Black Plague – a theme across the entire Prequelle album – specifically about how people would literally dance and party until they died to cope with the illness.

Reception
Metal Injection identified the song as the standout track on Prequelle.

Track listing

May 2018 release

August 2018 release

In Prequelle Exalted box set

Personnel
Credits adapted from liner notes.
 
Tobias Forge – vocals (credited as "Cardinal Copia")
A Group of Nameless Ghouls – lead guitar, rhythm guitar, bass guitar, keyboards, drums

Charts

Weekly charts

Year-end charts

Certifications

References

Songs about diseases and disorders
2018 songs
2018 singles
Ghost (Swedish band) songs
Loma Vista Recordings singles
Songs written by Tobias Forge
Songs written by Salem Al Fakir
Songs written by Vincent Pontare
Song recordings produced by Tom Dalgety